Black Rainbow Sound is the third studio album by English band Menace Beach. It was released on September 7, 2018 under Memphis Industries.

Critical reception
Black Rainbow Sound was met with "generally favorable" reviews from critics. At Metacritic, which assigns a weighted average rating out of 100 to reviews from mainstream publications, this release received an average score of 75, based on 8 reviews. Aggregator Album of the Year gave the release a 73 out of 100 based on a critical consensus of 11 reviews. Nick Roseblade from Clash Magazine said of the album: "[the album] shows a band in flux. The songs sounds bigger and more articulated. Menace Beach are using a larger musical palate and it mostly works, swapping the messy surf guitars and charming slacker vibes while allowing the songs to speak for themselves.

Track listing

References

2018 albums
Menace Beach (band) albums
Memphis Industries albums